Żelazowa Wola is a village in Gmina Sochaczew, Sochaczew County, Masovian Voivodeship, in east-central Poland.

The name means "Iron will" in Polish. The village is the birthplace of the Polish pianist and composer Frédéric Chopin. It is known for its picturesque Masovian landscape, including numerous winding streams surrounded by willows and hills.

In 1909, in celebration of Chopin's centenary, Russian composer Sergei Lyapunov wrote the symphonic poem, Zhelazova Vola (Żelazowa Wola), Op. 37, "in memory of Chopin".

Housed in an annex to the Chopin's home, surrounded by a park, is a museum devoted to the composer. In summer, concerts of his music are performed by pianists from all over the world, who play inside the family home for an outside audience. In an adjacent park is a monument to the pianist, designed by Józef Gosławski.

References

External links 
 Chopin's Poland. Żelazowa Wola

Villages in Sochaczew County
Frédéric Chopin